Squamulea is a genus of lichen-forming fungi in the family Teloschistaceae. It has 15 species. The genus was circumscribed in 2013 by Ulf Arup, Ulrik Søchting, and Patrik Frödén, with Squamulea subsoluta assigned as the type species. Five species were included in the original account of the genus. The genus name alludes to the squamulose growth form of most of its species. Squamulea has a worldwide distribution; when the genus was originally created, the centre of distribution was thought to be in southwestern North America.

Species

Squamulea chelonia  – Galapagos Islands
Squamulea coreana  – South Korea
Squamulea flakusii 
Squamulea galactophylla 
Squamulea humboldtiana  – Galapagos Islands
Squamulea loekoesiana 
Squamulea micromera 
Squamulea nesodes 
Squamulea oceanica  – Galapagos Islands
Squamulea osseophila  – Galapagos Islands
Squamulea parviloba 
Squamulea phyllidizans 
Squamulea squamosa 
Squamulea subsoluta 
Squamulea uttarkashiana  – Uttarakhand

One of the original lichens placed in this genus, Squamulea kiamae, has since been transferred to genus Filsoniana.

References

Teloschistales
Taxa described in 2013
Teloschistales genera
Lichen genera